Aedes (Muscidus) quasiferinus is a species complex of zoophilic mosquito belonging to the genus Aedes. It is found in Sri Lanka, Assam, Malaya, Thailand, Singapore and Indonesia.

References

External links
Scanning electron microscopy of the egg of Aedes (Muscidus) quasiferinus Mattingly 1961.
Mucidus Group - Mosquito Taxonomic Inventory

quasiferinus